This article details the Bradford Bulls rugby league football club's 2008 season. This is the 13th season of the Super League era.

Season Review

February 2008

March 2008

April 2008

May 2008

2008 Milestones

Round 2: Simon Finnigan scored his 1st try for the Bulls.
Round 4: Chris Feather and Wayne Godwin scored their 1st tries for the Bulls.
Round 6: Ben Jeffries scored his 1st try for the Bulls.
Round 9: Semi Tadulala and Chris Nero scored their 1st tries for the Bulls.
Round 9: Semi Tadulala scored his 1st hat-trick for the Bulls.
Round 10: Paul Deacon reached 2,300 points for the Bulls.
CCR4: Dave Halley scored his 1st four-try haul and 1st hat-trick for the Bulls.
CCR4: Glenn Morrison scored his 1st hat-trick for the Bulls.
CCR4: Semi Tadulala scored his 2nd hat-trick for the Bulls.
CCR4: Iestyn Harris reached 300 points for the Bulls.
Round 12: Paul Deacon kicked his 1,000th goal for the Bulls.
CCR5: Semi Tadulala scored his 3rd hat-trick for the Bulls.
Round 20: Iestyn Harris kicked his 100th goal for the Bulls.
Round 23: Andy Lynch scored his 25th try and reached 100 points for the Bulls.
Round 26: Paul Deacon reached 2,400 points for the Bulls.
Round 27: Semi Tadulala scored his 4th hat-trick for the Bulls.

Table

2008 Fixtures and results

2008 Engage Super League

Challenge Cup

Playoffs

2008 squad statistics

 Appearances and Points include (Super League, Challenge Cup and Play-offs) as of 2014.

References

External links
Bradford Bulls Website
Bradford Bulls in T&A
Bradford Bulls on Sky Sports
Bradford on Super League Site
Red,Black And Amber
BBC Sport-Rugby League 

Bradford Bulls seasons
Bradford Bulls